Emilie Hegh Arntzen (born 1 January 1994) is a Norwegian handball player for CSM București and the Norwegian national team.

Her achievements include one victory in the Women's EHF Champions League as club player, one Olympic bronze medal, one gold and one silver medal at the IHF World Women's Handball Championships, and four times European champion.

Career

Club career
As youth player, Hegh Arntzen represented the clubs Stord HK, Herkules and Gulset IF. At senior level she played for Gjerpen IF from 2010 to 2014. From 2014 to 2017 she represented the club Byåsen IL, and then Vipers Kristiansand from 2017 to 2021. With Vipers, she won the Norwegian League four times, in the seasons 2017/2018, 2018/2019, 2019/2020, and 2020/2021, as well as winning the Norwegian Cup four times. With Vipers, she also won the 2020–21 Women's EHF Champions League.

She started playing for CSM București from 2021.

National team
Hegh Arntzen made her debut on the national team in 2014.

Her achievements with the national team include winning a gold medal at the 2021 World Women's Handball Championship, having won a silver medal in 2017. She also won a bronze medal at the 2016 Summer Olympics, and became European champion in 2014, 2016, 2020 and 2022.

She also represented Norway in the 2013 Women's Junior European Handball Championship, placing 4th, and in the 2014 Women's Junior World Handball Championship, placing 9th.

Personal life
Hegh Arntzen was born in Skien on 1 January 1994.
She is the daughter of former international handballer Hanne Hegh and  handball player and coach Ketil Arntzen.

Achievements
Olympic Games:
Bronze Medalist: 2016
World Championship:
Gold Medalist: 2021
Silver Medalist: 2017
European Championship:
Winner: 2014, 2016, 2020, 2022
World Youth Championship:
Bronze Medalist: 2012
Youth European Championship:
Bronze Medalist: 2011
EHF Champions League:
Winner: 2020/2021
Bronze medalist: 2018/2019
EHF Cup:
Finalist: 2018
Romanian Cup:
Winner: 2022 
Romanian Supercup:
Winner: 2022 
Finalist: 2021

Norwegian League:
Winner: 2017/2018, 2018/2019, 2019/2020, 2020/2021
Norwegian Cup:
Winner: 2017, 2018, 2019, 2020

Individual awards
MVP of the 2022 Romanian Cup
Best Centre Back in the month of September 2016, Grundigligaen 2016/2017

References

External links

1994 births
Living people
Sportspeople from Skien
Norwegian female handball players
Handball players at the 2016 Summer Olympics
Olympic handball players of Norway
Olympic bronze medalists for Norway
Medalists at the 2016 Summer Olympics
Olympic medalists in handball
Norwegian expatriate sportspeople in Romania
21st-century Norwegian women